Tagiades nestus, the Papuan snow flat or Nestus flat, is a butterfly of the family Hesperiidae. It is found on the Australian islands in the Torres Strait and in New Guinea.

Its wingspan is about 40 mm.

Its larvae feed on Dioscorea species. The caterpillars nibble pieces out of the margins of the leaves leaving characteristic scalloped edges to the foliage. They live in shelters composed of pairs of such leaves joined with silk.

Subspecies
Tagiades nestus nestus
Tagiades nestus sivoa Swinhoe, 1904 (New Guinea)

External links
Australian Insects

Tagiades
Butterflies described in 1860
Butterflies of Oceania